Vyaz ( from  , ;
,  'to bind, to tie') is a type of ancient decorative Cyrillic lettering, in which letters are linked into a continuous ornament. It first appeared in South Slavic monuments in the 13th century, and was also used from the end of the 14th to the beginning of the 15th centuries in the East Slavic and Wallachian regions. Under the reign of Ivan the Terrible, Vyaz developed considerably, but was later abandoned.

See also
Serbian calligraphy

External links 
 Examples of the Russian Vyaz: , 

Cyrillic script
Calligraphy